Microsveltia is a genus of sea snails, marine gastropod mollusks in the family Cancellariidae, the nutmeg snails.

Species
Species within the genus Microsveltia include:
 Microsveltia chihyehi S.-I Huang, M.-H. Lin, 2022
 Microsveltia chinglini S.-I Huang, M.-H. Lin, 2022
 Microsveltia chinhuii S.-I Huang & M.-H. Lin, 2021
 Microsveltia daili S.-I Huang, M.-H. Lin, 2022
 Microsveltia haswelli (Garrard, 1975)
 Microsveltia humaboni Verhecken, 2011
 Microsveltia ifengi S.-I Huang & M.-H. Lin, 2020
 Microsveltia insulaguishan S.-I Huang, M.-H. Lin, 2022
 Microsveltia karubar Verhecken, 1997
 Microsveltia laratensis Verhecken, 2011
 Microsveltia machaira Verhecken, 2011
 Microsveltia marisorientalis S.-I Huang, M.-H. Lin, 2022
 Microsveltia metivieri Verhecken, 1997
 Microsveltia patricia (Thiele, 1925)
 Microsveltia procerula Verhecken, 1997
 Microsveltia radii S.-I Huang & M.-H. Lin, 2021
 Microsveltia recessa Iredale, 1925
 Microsveltia sagamiensis (Kuroda & Habe, 1971)
 Microsveltia tupasi Verhecken, 2011
 Microsveltia wenderi S.-I Huang & M.-H. Lin, 2020

References

External links
 Iredale T. (1925). Mollusca from the continental shelf of eastern Australia. Records of the Australian Museum. 14(4): 243-270, pls 41-43
 Hemmen J. (2007) Recent Cancellariidae. Annotated and illustrated catalogue of Recent Cancellariidae. Privately published, Wiesbaden. 428 pp. [With amendments and corrections taken from Petit R.E. (2012) A critique of, and errata for, Recent Cancellariidae by Jens Hemmen, 2007. Conchologia Ingrata 9: 1-8

Cancellariidae